The 1992 First Union 400 was the seventh stock car race of the 1992 NASCAR Winston Cup Series season and the 42nd iteration of the event. The race was held on Sunday, April 4, 1992, before an audience of 44,000 in North Wilkesboro, North Carolina at the North Wilkesboro Speedway, a  oval short track. The race took the scheduled 400 laps to complete. At race's end, Robert Yates Racing driver Davey Allison would manage to defend the field in the last 88 laps to take his 15th career NASCAR Winston Cup Series victory and his second victory of the season. With the victory, Allison was able to grow his driver's championship points lead to 86 points. To fill out the top three, Penske Racing South driver Rusty Wallace and Hendrick Motorsports driver Ricky Rudd would finish second and third, respectively.

Background 

North Wilkesboro Speedway is a short oval racetrack located on U.S. Route 421, about five miles east of the town of North Wilkesboro, North Carolina, or 80 miles north of Charlotte. It measures  and features a unique uphill backstretch and downhill frontstretch. It has previously held races in NASCAR's top three series, including 93 Winston Cup Series races. The track, a NASCAR original, operated from 1949, NASCAR's inception, until the track's original closure in 1996. The speedway briefly reopened in 2010 and hosted several stock car series races before closing again in the spring of 2011. It was re-opened in August 2022 for grassroots racing.

Entry list 

 (R) denotes rookie driver.

*Replaced by Jimmy Hensley in qualifying due to injuries. Allison would, however, race in the event.

Qualifying 
Qualifying was split into two rounds. The first round was held on Friday, April 10, at 3:00 PM EST. Each driver would have one lap to set a time. During the first round, the top 15 drivers in the round would be guaranteed a starting spot in the race. If a driver was not able to guarantee a spot in the first round, they had the option to scrub their time from the first round and try and run a faster lap time in a second round qualifying run, held on Saturday, April 11, at 12:15 PM EST. As with the first round, each driver would have one lap to set a time. For this specific race, positions 16-30 would be decided on time, and depending on who needed it, a select amount of positions were given to cars who had not otherwise qualified but were high enough in owner's points; up to two were given. If needed, a past champion who did not qualify on either time or provisionals could use a champion's provisional, adding one more spot to the field.

No drivers would fail to qualify.

Full qualifying results

Race results

Standings after the race 

Drivers' Championship standings

Note: Only the first 10 positions are included for the driver standings.

References 

1992 NASCAR Winston Cup Series
NASCAR races at North Wilkesboro Speedway
April 1992 sports events in the United States
1992 in sports in North Carolina